The Federal Department of Justice and Police is one of the seven departments of the Swiss federal government. As of 2023, it is headed by Federal Councillor Élisabeth Baume-Schneider. Until 1979, the department was known as the Department of Justice and Police.

Organisation 
The department is composed of the following offices and institutes:

 General Secretariat
 State Secretariat for Migration (SEM): Responsible for matters relating to foreign nationals and asylum seekers.
 Federal Office of Justice (FOI): Responsible for providing legal advice to the administration, preparing general legislation, supervising government registers and collaborating on international judicial assistance.
 Federal Office of Police (fedpol): Responsible for intercantonal and international information, coordination and analysis in internal security matters. It also operates the domestic intelligence service (Service for Analysis and Prevention SAP), and the Federal Criminal Police (FCP), which investigates crimes subject to federal jurisdiction.
 Federal Office of Metrology (METAS): Provides calibration and accreditation services, supervises the use of measuring instruments and provides training in metrology.
 Swiss Federal Institute of Intellectual Property (IIP): Registration authority for patents, trademarks and industrial design.
 Swiss Institute of Comparative Law (SICL): Provides consultancy services on issues of comparative law.

The following independent authorities are affiliated to the FDJP for administrative purposes:
Federal Gaming Board (FGB): Regulates casinos and enforces Swiss gambling law (except lotteries, which are regulated by the cantons).

List of heads of the department

References

External links 
 

 
Justice and Police